Poul Ib Gjessing (31 March 1909 – 23 June 1944) was a sea captain and member of the Danish resistance executed by the German occupying power.

Biography 

Gjessing was born in Silkeborg on 31 March 1909 to painter Ejnar Gjessing and wife Ane Dorthea Jørgine Hansen and baptized Paul Ib Gjessing at home the same day. His baptism was confirmed in Lime church on the third Sunday after Trinity.

In March 1944 the Gestapo made an "incredible number of arrests" including ten arrests in the region of Års. The presumed leader of the Års group was the 35-year-old sea Captain Gjessing, who was found to have in his Hasseris home a large weapons cache and about 50 fake police badges.

On 23 June 1944 Gjessing and seven other members of the resistance were executed in Ryvangen.

After his death 
The January 1945 issue of the resistance newspaper Frit Danmark (Free Denmark) reported on the execution of the eight resistance members including Gjessing.

After the liberation Gjessing's remains and those of at least six of the others executed with him were found in Ryvangen and transferred to the Department of Forensic Medicine of the university of Copenhagen.

On 29 August 1945 Gjessing and 105 other victims of the occupation were given a state funeral in the memorial park founded at the execution site in Ryvangen. Bishop Hans Fuglsang-Damgaard led the service with participation from the royal family, the government and representatives of the resistance movement.

References 

1909 births
1944 deaths
Danish people executed by Nazi Germany
Danish people of World War II
Danish resistance members
Resistance members killed by Nazi Germany
Danish sailors
People from Silkeborg